Evandro Amorim Barbosa (born August 24, 1992 Sao Sebastian do Paraíso, Brazil) is a Brazilian chess player. He became a FIDE Master in 2009 and International Master in 2011. He obtained the Grandmaster (GM) title in 2016. In 2016, he represented Brazil in 42nd Chess Olympiad held in Baku.

Notable Tournaments

References 

1992 births
Living people
Brazilian chess players
Chess grandmasters
Chess Olympiad competitors